Light the Torch (formerly Devil You Know) is an American metalcore supergroup formed in Los Angeles in 2012.  They are currently signed to Nuclear Blast Records and have released four albums: two under the "Devil You Know" moniker (The Beauty of Destruction and They Bleed Red) and two under the "Light the Torch" name (Revival and You Will Be the Death of Me).

History

Devil You Know (2012–2017)
The band started when guitarist Francesco Artusato (All Shall Perish, Hiss of Atrocities) and drummer John Sankey (Devolved) began jamming and writing together in 2012. After 30 to 40 song ideas were written the two decided to look for a vocalist. A couple of early demo recordings were sent to Howard Jones (Killswitch Engage, Blood Has Been Shed) who subsequently got interested and joined the band in late 2012. They named the band Devil You Know.

In early 2013, the band started recording with producer and ex-Machine Head guitarist Logan Mader (Gojira, Five Finger Death Punch). 

On October 23, 2013, it was announced the band signed to Nuclear Blast. A day later the first demo song "Shut It Down" was released online through the band's Facebook page. On October 31, 2013, the demo was released officially through the label YouTube channel.

On December 19, 2013, it was announced that the band finished recording of the album and that bassist Ryan Wombacher (Bleeding Through) and guitarist Roy Lev-Ari (Hiss of Atrocities) joined the band.

In February–March 2014, the band took part in Soundwave Festival in Australia.

On March 5, 2014, the debut single "Seven Years Alone" was released. On March 27, 2014, the official music video for "Seven Years Alone" was released.

The band's debut album The Beauty of Destruction was mixed by Chris "Zeuss" Harris and was released on April 24 (EU), April 28 (UK) and April 29, 2014 (US and the rest of the world) via Nuclear Blast. It charted at No. 50 on the Billboard 200, selling nearly 6,000 units in the first week.

In April–June 2014, the band took part in Revolver Golden Gods Tour with Black Label Society, Down and Butcher Babies.

On October 31, 2014, a music video for "It's Over" was released. On March 9, 2015, the band released an official music video for "As Bright as the Darkness".

In June 2015, the band started recording the second album.

On September 10, 2015, the band released "Stay of Execution", the first single off the second album titled They Bleed Red which was released on November 6, 2015, via Nuclear Blast.

Light the Torch (2017–present)
On July 26, 2017, the band announced via social media that they have changed their name to Light the Torch, without an explanation beyond stating "A full statement will be made soon and a new album is very close to being completed. It's a new beginning and we couldn't be more excited." Jones revealed in an interview on October 13, 2017, that the band had to change its name due to legal issues surrounding Sankey's departure from the band, and how the latter wanted to claim part copyright of the name.

Light the Torch released their first studio album Revival on March 30, 2018.

The band released their latest album, You Will Be the Death of Me, on June 25, 2021.

On April 9, 2021, the band released their single "Wilting in the Light" on YouTube from their latest album You Will Be the Death of Me. The music video features Alex Rüdinger from Whitechapel as the band's new drummer. On June 4, 2021, they released another single titled "Let Me Fall Apart".

Band members

Current
 Francesco Artusato – lead guitar (2012–present), rhythm guitar (2012–2013, 2015–present)
 Howard Jones – lead vocals (2012–present)
 Ryan Wombacher – bass, backing vocals (2013–present)
 Alex Rüdinger – drums (2021–present)

Touring musicians
 John Boecklin – drums (2016)
 Nick Augusto – drums (2016–2017)
 Aaron Stechauner - drums (2022)

Former
 John Sankey – drums (2012–2016)
 Roy Lev-Ari – rhythm guitar (2013–2015)
 Mike Sciulara – drums (2018–2019)
 Kyle Baltus – drums (2019–2021)

Discography
as Devil You Know:
The Beauty of Destruction (2014)
They Bleed Red (2015)

as Light the Torch:
Revival (2018)
You Will Be the Death of Me (2021)

Singles

Awards and nominations

Metal Hammer Golden Gods Awards

|-
|| 2014 || Devil You Know ||Best New Band|| 
|-

References

External links

2012 establishments in California
Heavy metal musical groups from California
Metalcore musical groups from California
Musical groups established in 2012
Nuclear Blast artists
Musical quintets